Bhutanghat is a village in the Alipurduar district of West Bengal.

References

Villages in Alipurduar district